Arnaldus de Villa Nova (also called Arnau de Vilanova in Catalan, his language, Arnaldus Villanovanus, Arnaud de Ville-Neuve or Arnaldo de Villanueva, c. 1240–1311) was a physician and a religious reformer. He was also thought to be an alchemist (his house in Montpellier, France, had a carved door showing a roaring lion and dragon that bit his tail, also known as Ouroboros, both recognized alchemical symbols). The fact that several renowned alchemists recognized him as an adept reinforces the thesis that he was an alchemist. He was also, like most wise men of his time, an astrologer.

He was born in the Crown of Aragon, probably Villanueva de Jiloca (Aragon) or Valencia, and he studied medicine and he also took some courses of theology. After living at the court of Aragon and teaching for many years in the Montpellier School of Medicine, he went to Paris, where he gained a considerable reputation; but he incurred the enmity of ecclesiastics. In 1311 he was summoned to Avignon by Pope Clement V, but he died on the voyage off the coast of Genoa.

He is credited with translating a number of medical texts from Arabic, including works by Ibn Sina Avicenna, Abu-l-Salt, and Galen. Many alchemical writings, including Rosarius Philosophorum, Novum Lumen, or Flos Florum, are also ascribed to him, but they are not authentic. Collected editions of them were published at Lyon in 1504 and 1532 (with a biography by Symphorianus Campegius), at Basel in 1585, and at Lyon in 1686.  He is also the reputed author of important medical works, such as Speculum medicinae and Regimen sanitatis ad regem Aragonum, but many others, such as Breviarium Practicae, were falsely attributed to him. In addition, he wrote many theological works for the reformation of Christianity in Latin and in Catalan, some of them including apocalyptical prophecies.

Biography

Arnaldus' place and date of birth are debated: some historians believe he was born in Villeneuve-lès-Maguelone, a village near Montpellier; others are doubtful, because there are also towns of the same name in Aragon, in the Kingdom of Valencia (now in Spain), in Catalonia, in Languedoc, in Provence. Regardless, he is known in Catalonia, Valencia, and Balearic Islands by the name "Arnau de Vilanova," and it is certain that he wrote most of his works in Valencian (Confessió de Barcelona, Raonament d'Avinyó). Whatever the reality, Arnaldus had a great reputation as a doctor, theologian and alchemist.

He studied medicine in Montpellier until 1260. He traveled through France, Catalonia, and Italy, as part doctor, part ambassador. He was the personal doctor of the King of Aragon from 1281. At the death of Peter III of Aragon in 1285, he left Barcelona for Montpellier.

Influenced by Joachim of Fiore, he claimed that in 1378 the world would end and the Antichrist would come (De adventu Antichristi, 1288). He was condemned by the University of Paris in 1299, accused of heresy, and imprisoned for his ideas of church reform.  He was saved through the intervention of Boniface VIII, whom Arnaldus had cured of a painful illness. He was once again imprisoned in Paris around 1304, under pope Benedict XI. The Sorbonne ordered his philosophical works to be burned.

He was the master of the school of medicine between 1291 and 1299. His fame as a doctor was immense: among his patients were three popes and three kings. He was the first physician that used alcohol as an antiseptic.

He became an ambassador for James II, king of Aragon and Sicily. He sought refuge from the Inquisition at the court of Frederick III in Sicily, and was later called to Avignon as a doctor for pope Clement V.  He is certainly behind the papal bull of 8 September 1309, which required of medical students knowledge of some fifteen Greco-Arabic treatises, including ones by Galen and Avicenna.

He died in a shipwreck near Genoa in 1311 while on a diplomatic mission. The inquisitor of Tarragona condemned him, and fifteen of his propositions were censured.

A list of writings is given by J. Ferguson in his Bibliotheca Chemica (1906). See also U. Chevalier, Repertoire des sources hist., &c., Bio-bibliographie (Paris, 1903).

See also

 Brazen Head
 Latin translations of the 12th century
 Litmus

Footnotes

References

 J. B. Haureau in the Histoire litteraire de la France (1881), vol. 28; 
E. Lalande, Arnaud de Villeneuve, sa vie et ses oeuvres (Paris, 1896).

Further reading

External links
 Who is Arnau de Vilanova, full presentation of Arnau de Vilanova and his works provided by the project Arnau DB at the Universitat Autònoma de Barcelona.
 Arnaldus Villanovanus Catholic Encyclopedia
 Juanita A. Daly, Arnald of Vilanova: Physician and Prophet
 
 Works attributed to Arnaldus
 Excerpta medica - Mscr.Dresd.C.278. [S.l.] 1500, Online-Ausgabe der Sächsischen Landesbibliothek - Staats- und Universitätsbibliothek Dresden
 Opus aureum. Frankfurt a. Mayn 1604, Online-Ausgabe der Sächsischen Landesbibliothek - Staats- und Universitätsbibliothek Dresden
 Hermetis Trismegisti Phoenicum Aegyptiorum Sed et aliarum Gentium Monarchae Conditoris ... sive Tabula Smaragdina. [Leipzig] 1657, Online-Ausgabe der Sächsischen Landesbibliothek - Staats- und Universitätsbibliothek Dresden
 Hermetischer Rosenkrantz, Das ist: Vier schöne, außerlesene Chymische Tractätlein. [Hamburg] 1682, Online-Ausgabe  der Sächsischen Landesbibliothek - Staats- und Universitätsbibliothek Dresden
 Lewis E 18 Liber de vinis at OPenn

1240 births
1311 deaths
13th-century alchemists
13th-century apocalypticists
13th-century Latin writers
13th-century physicians
13th-century translators
Arabic–Latin translators
Scientists from Catalonia
Medieval Catalan-language writers
People from Valencia
13th-century people from the Kingdom of Aragon
14th-century people from the Kingdom of Aragon